Aug is a hard rock band from New Jersey. The band was formed in 2008 and have since released two albums and have opened for many bands including King's X, Savatage and Joe Lynn Turner. The band is also notable for the lead singer's voice, which is similar to Ozzy Osbourne. The band has appeared in the program That Metal Show.

The band released its debut album, entitled 20 Years in Hell. In 2014, the band released its second album, entitled Be Careful What You Wish For.

Band members
Current members
 Aug (Anthony Agostine) – vocals
 Rich Tanis – bass, backing vocals
 Tommy Shauger – lead guitar, vocals
 Russ LaMater – drums, percussion

Discography
 20 Years In Hell (2011)
 Be Careful What You Wish For (2014)

References

External links
 

2008 establishments in New Jersey
American hard rock musical groups
Heavy metal musical groups from New Jersey
Musical groups established in 2008